Solidarity is an album by Canadian singer-songwriter Joel Plaskett and Bill Plaskett, released February 17, 2017 on Pheromone Recordings. Bill Plaskett, Joel's father, is a folk musician and founder of the Lunenburg Folk Music Festival in Lunenburg, Nova Scotia, but has never previously recorded an album.

The title track was released online as a preview of the album in November 2016. "The Next Blue Sky" followed in January 2017 as the album's first official single.

The album was supported by a cross-Canada tour, including a date at Toronto's Massey Hall in April 2017.

Track listing

References

2017 albums
Joel Plaskett albums